Primula obconica is a species of flowering plant in the family Primulaceae, native to China.

The specific epithet obconica means "inverted cone", referring to the convex flowers.

This is a tender plant which us usually grown annually as a houseplant or in a cool greenhouse. Numerous cultivars have been developed, of which 'Libre Magenta' has gained the Royal Horticultural Society's Award of Garden Merit. 

The hairs on the leaves may cause allergic reactions.

References

Flora of China
obconica